Wolfgang Müller (born 18 February 1938) is a German field hockey player. He competed in the men's tournament at the 1968 Summer Olympics.

References

External links
 

1938 births
Living people
German male field hockey players
Olympic field hockey players of West Germany
Field hockey players at the 1968 Summer Olympics
Sportspeople from Hanover
20th-century German people